The Elon Phoenix football program is a college football team that represents Elon University in the Colonial Athletic Association, a part of the NCAA Division I Football Championship Subdivision.  The team has had 21 head coaches since its first recorded football game in 1909. Since December 2018, Tony Trisciani has served as head coach at Elon.

Key

Coaches             
Statistics correct through the second game of the 2022 college football season.

Notes

References             
             
             

       
Lists of college football head coaches             

North Carolina sports-related lists